is a Japanese composer.

Biography 
From 1954 to 1960, he studied in Paris with Tony Aubin, Olivier Messiaen, Simone Plé-Caussade, Pierre Revel and Louis Fourrestier. He held a scholarship from the German Academic Exchange Service in 1966 and 1967 and won a scholarship from the Italian government in 1969. In 1971, he was awarded the Rockefeller Prize from the Columbia Princeton Electronic Music Center and in 1978 won a scholarship from the Dutch government.

He worked with electronic music at the Institute of Sonology in Utrecht, at the electronic studio at the Technische Universität Berlin, at the Columbia Princeton Electronic Music Center in New York (1971–72) and at Studio NHK (Nippon Hōsō Kyōkai) in Tokyo. In 1978 Shinohara was a visiting professor of composition at McGill University in Montreal, Canada.

Since the 1970s, he has been best known for combining Western and traditional Japanese musics, as well as versatile experimentation with Western acoustic and electronic music.

Works

Orchestral 
 1975 Egalisation for 24 instruments (piccolo, flute, alto flute, oboe, English horn clarinet, bass clarinet, trumpet, trombone, tuba, piano, celesta, cembalo, harp, guitar, vibraphone, marimba, percussion, violin, viola, cello, and double bass)
 1970 Visions for 3 flutes, 4 oboes, 4 clarinets, 4 bassoons, 4 horns, 4 trumpets, 4 trombones, 6 percussion, harp, celesta, 24 violins, 8 violas, 8 cellos, 4 double basses
 1975 Visions II
1977  Liberation  for 20 string instruments
 1992 Yumeji (Ways of Dreams) for an orchestra of Japanese and Western instruments and mixed choir
 Solitude pour orchestra

Wind orchestra 
 1982/1985 Play for Nine Wind Instruments (flute, alto flute, oboe, clarinet, bass clarinet, bassoon, horn, trumpet, and trombone)

Chamber music 
 1958 Sonata for violin and piano
 Allegro moderato
 Lento
 Allegro brutale
 1960 Obsession for oboe and piano
1960 Kassouga for flute and piano
 1968 Fragmente for tenor recorder
 1970 Reflexion for solo oboe
 1983/1993 Turns for violin and koto
 1984 Tabiyuki (On travel) for mezzo-soprano and small ensemble (flute, oboe, clarinet, bassoon, horn, trumpet, trombone, percussion, violin, viola, cello and double bass)
 1986/1990 Evolution for solo cello
 1990 Cooperation for 8 traditional Japanese and 8 Western instruments (English horn, clarinet, trumpet, trombone, percussion, piano, violin, and cello)
 1993 Situations for alto saxophone and digital keyboard
 2005 Turns for violin and koto
 Consonance for flute, horn, vibraphone, marimba, harp and cello
 Relations for flute and piano

Percussion ensemble 
 1962 Alternance

Keyboard 
 Elevation for organ
 1963/1969 Tendence pour piano
 1996 Undulation A for piano
 The Bear who saw the Sea for two pianos

Music for traditional Japanese instruments 
 1972 Tatuyai (Fluctuation) for koto, percussion, and singer
 1972 Tuyatai (Fluctuation) for sangen
 1973 Kyudo A (In quest of enlightenment) for shakuhachi
 1973 Kyudo B for shakuhachi and harp
 1981 Jushichigen-no-Umare (Birth of the bass koto) for 17-Gen
 1981 Nagare for Shamisen for shamisen, sangen, kin and gongs

Electronic music 
 1966 Memoires 4-channel electronic composition composed at the Institute of Sonology in Utrecht
 1974 Broadcasting
 1979 City Visit for 4-channel tape
 1980 Passage for bass flute and stereophony
 To Rain and Wind for koto, percussion and live electronics
 Personnage

References

Sources

Further reading
 Landy, Leigh. 1987. "An Analysis of Tayutai for Koto (1972) Composed by Makoto Shinohara". Interface: Journal of New Music Research 16:75–96
 Shinohara, Makoto. 2003. "Zusammenspiel westlicher und japanischer Instrumente". In Komposition und Musikwissenschaft im Dialog. III (1999–2001), edited by Imke Misch and Christoph von Blumröder. Signale aus Köln 6. Münster: Lit-Verlag.

1931 births
20th-century classical composers
20th-century Japanese male musicians
21st-century classical composers
21st-century Japanese musicians
21st-century Japanese male musicians
Japanese classical composers
Japanese male classical composers
Living people
Pupils of Karlheinz Stockhausen
Tokyo University of the Arts alumni